The Uffington White Horse is a prehistoric hill figure,  long, formed from deep trenches filled with crushed white chalk. The hill forms a part of the scarp of the Berkshire Downs and overlooks the Vale of White Horse to the north. The best views of the figure are obtained from the air, or from directly across the Vale, particularly around the villages of Great Coxwell, Longcot, and Fernham.

The Uffington White Horse was created some time between 1380 and 550 , during the late Bronze Age or early Iron Age. The site is owned and managed by the National Trust and is a scheduled monument. The Guardian stated in 2003 that "for more than 3,000 years, the Uffington White Horse has been jealously guarded as a masterpiece of minimalist art." The Uffington Horse is by far the oldest of the white horse figures in Britain and is of an entirely different design from the others inspired by it.

Origin

The earliest reference to the site is found in Medieval Welsh literature. The Llyfr Coch Hergest (Red Book of Hergest, 1375–1425) states that "Near to the town of Abinton there is a mountain with a figure of a stallion upon it, and it is white. Nothing grows upon it." Some scholars have compared the figure to the Celtic goddess Epona, or the later Rhiannon of the Mabinogi

The figure is one of a number in the area that was long thought to have ancient origins. In the 17th century, John Aubrey attributed the figure to Hengist and Horsa. However, Aubrey also ascribed its origins to the British Celts, noting the similarity of the image to those found on native Iron Age coins. Francis Wise would state that the image was created by Alfred the Great to celebrate his victory at the Battle of Edington.

Although the notion of it being a post-Roman creation remained popular, many antiquarians and scholars had noted the designs similarity to the Celtic art found on the coins of the local tribes (the Dobunni and Atrebates). Comparative analysis of the design with numismatic and archeological finds was conducted by Stuart Piggott in 1931 and Ann Ross in 1967, with Piggott suggesting circa 100  as a possible date of origin. In 1949, Morris Marple suggested a Bronze Age date, comparing the design to others throughout Europe and North Africa.

Following an excavation in 1990, the figure's origin was finally settled with optically stimulated luminescence testing. Simon Palmer and David Miles of the Oxford Archaeological Unit dated silt deposits to the period between 1380BCE and 550BCE, confirming the Uffington White Horse to be Britain's oldest chalk figure. The new Bronze Age date would place the figures origin at the same time as Uffington Castle, during a period when the horse was transforming British warfare.

History
Until the late 19th century, the horse was scoured every seven years as part of a more general local fair held on the hill. Francis Wise wrote in 1736: "The ceremony of scouring the Horse, from time immemorial, has been solemnized by a numerous concourse of people from all the villages roundabout." After the work was done a rural festival was held sponsored by the lord of the manor.

During the Second World War the figure, easily recognisable from the air, was covered over with turf and hedge trimmings so that Luftwaffe pilots could not use it for navigation during bombing raids. It was uncovered after the war by Welsh archaeology professor William Francis Grimes.
 
In August 2002, the figure was defaced with the addition of a rider and three dogs by members of the "Real Countryside Alliance" (Real CA). The act was denounced by the Countryside Alliance. Soon afterwards for a couple of days in May 2003, a temporary hill figure advertisement for the fourth series of Channel 4's series Big Brother was controversially placed near the figure. In March 2012, as part of a pre-Cheltenham Festival publicity stunt, a bookmaker added a large jockey to the figure.

Representation and meaning
It has long been debated whether the chalk figure was intended to represent a horse or some other animal, such as a dog or a sabre-toothed cat. However, it has been called a horse since the 11th century at least. A cartulary of Abingdon Abbey, compiled between 1072 and 1084, refers to "mons albi equi" at Uffington ("the White Horse Hill").

The horse is thought to represent a tribal symbol, perhaps connected with the builders of Uffington Castle. It is similar to horses depicted on Celtic coinage, the currency of the pre-Romano-British population, and on the Marlborough Bucket (an Iron Age burial bucket found in Marlborough, Wiltshire).

Another theory proposed by University of Southampton archaeologist Joshua Pollard points to the horse's alignment with the sun, particularly in midwinter when the sun appears to overtake the horse, to indicate that it was created as a depiction of a "solar horse", reflecting mythological beliefs that the sun was carried across the sky on a horse or in a chariot.

Scouring of the White Horse
The White Horse has been carefully cleared of vegetation from time to time. The figure has remained clear of turf throughout its long existence, except for being covered as a precaution during the Second World War (as it could be used as a visual landmark for navigation by enemy planes). The cleaning process, known as the Scouring of the White Horse, was formerly made the occasion of a festival. Sports of all kinds were held, and keen rivalry was maintained, not only between the inhabitants of the local villages, but between local champions and those from distant parts of England.

The first of such festivals known took place in 1755 and they died out only subsequently to 1857, after 30,000 people turned up for the event. The Scouring of the White Horse, by Tom Hughes, was published in 1859 as a semi-fictionalised recounting of his visit to the 1857 event. He recounts being told that the local towns had laid claim to a tradition of scouring the White Horse since Saxon times.

The tradition was revived in 2009 by the National Trust, with local volunteers replacing a layer of freshly quarried chalk on the Spring Bank Holiday weekend. Frequent work is required for the figure to remain visible. If regular cleaning is halted, the figure quickly becomes obscured; Periodic scouring continues, on chalking day volunteers with hammers, buckets of chalk, and kneepads kneel and "smash the chalk to a paste, whitening the paths cut in the grass inch by inch."

Nearby prehistoric features

The most significant nearby feature is the Iron Age Uffington Castle, located on higher ground atop a knoll above the White Horse. This hillfort comprises an area of approximately  enclosed by a single, well-preserved bank and ditch. Dragon Hill is a natural chalk hill with an artificial flat top, associated in legend with St George.

Whitehorse Hill is designated a Site of Special Scientific Interest (SSSI). It is a geological SSSI due to its Pleistocene sediments, and a biological SSSI as it has one of the few remaining unploughed grasslands along the chalk escarpment in Oxfordshire.

To the west are ice-cut terraces known as the "Giant's Stair". Some believe these terraces at the bottom of this valley are the result of medieval farming, or alternatively were used for early farming after being formed by natural processes. The steep sided dry valley below the horse is known as the Manger and legend says that the horse grazes there at night.

It lies next to The Ridgeway, an ancient trackway that also runs behind Uffington Castle, and is followed by the Ridgeway National Trail, a long-distance footpath running from Overton Hill, near Avebury,  to Ivinghoe Beacon in Buckinghamshire.

In 2019, a group of workers laying water pipes near Letcombe Bassett unearthed an almost 3,000 year-old settlement that archaeologists believe to belong to the same community involved in the creation of the Uffington White Horse. The find includes tools, animal bones and the remains of 26 people whose skeletons suggest human sacrifice.

Influence and cultural references
The horse was a direct influence on much later hill figures of white horses, including Kilburn White Horse (1858) in Yorkshire, Folkestone White Horse (2003) at the Channel Tunnel terminal near Kent, and a white horse cut from heather that existed from 1981 until the mid-1990s in Mossley, Greater Manchester. The first Westbury White Horse, which faced left, is also believed to have been inspired by the Uffington horse. The Uffington White Horse has also inspired lookalike hill figures, including one facing left in Ciudad Juárez, Mexico. Direct replicas of the Uffington horse can be found at Cockington Green Gardens in Australia and Hogansville, Georgia, USA. Uffington White Horse has also inspired two sculptures in Wiltshire, namely Julie Livsey's White Horse Pacified (1987) in nearby Swindon, a town which was also once considered for a white horse, and Charlotte Moreton's White Horse (2010) in Solstice Park, Amesbury.

The White Horse is used as a symbol by diverse organisations (mostly with Oxfordshire or Berkshire connections) and appears in numerous works of literature, visual art and music.

As an emblem
The White Horse is the emblem of the Vale of White Horse District Council, the Berkshire Yeomanry (an Army Reserve unit based in Windsor), and educational establishments including Faringdon Community College, The Ridgeway School and Sixth Form College in Wroughton, Wiltshire, and The Ridgeway Primary School in Whitley, Berkshire.

Literature
Thomas Hughes, the author of Tom Brown's Schooldays, who was born in the nearby village of Uffington, wrote a book called The Scouring of the White Horse. Published in 1859, and described as "a combined travel book and record of regional history in the guise of a novel, sort of", it recounts the traditional festivities surrounding the periodic renovation of the White Horse. In Idylls of the King, written between 1859 and 1885, Tennyson compares King Arthur's removal of certain corrupt judges, who had been installed by his predecessor, Uther, to the way in which "Men weed the White Horse on the Berkshire hills, to keep him bright and clean as heretofore." G.K. Chesterton also features the scouring of the White Horse in his epic poem The Ballad of the White Horse, published in 1911, a romanticised depiction of the exploits of King Alfred the Great.

In modern fiction, Rosemary Sutcliff's 1977 children's book Sun Horse, Moon Horse tells a fictional story of the Bronze Age creator of the figure, and the White Horse and nearby Wayland's Smithy feature in a 1920s setting in the Inspector Ian Rutledge mystery/detective novel A Pale Horse by Charles Todd; a depiction of the White Horse appears on the book's dust jacket. Tom Shippey suggests that the horse may have also inspired the banner flown by the horsemen of Rohan in J.R.R. Tolkien's Middle Earth legendarium, which is a white horse upon a green field. The horse is also central to the 1978 BBC Television serial The Moon Stallion by Brian Hayles, who later novelised the series. "The horse on the chalk" in Terry Pratchett's Tiffany Aching series is inspired by the Uffington White Horse. Pratchett (who is famous for his sardonic humor) said "By an amazing coincidence, the horse carved on the chalk in A Hat Full of Sky (2004) is remarkably similar to the Uffington White Horse." The White Horse is a significant setting, plot point, and symbol in the 2018 novel Lethal White, the fourth instalment in the Cormoran Strike detective series.

Music
David Bedford's Song of the White Horse (1978), set for ensemble and children's choir and commissioned for the BBC's Omnibus programme, depicts a journey along a footpath alongside the Uffington Horse and includes words from Chesterton's poem. The composition requires the choir to inhale helium to sing the "stratospherically high notes" of the climax, accompanied by aerial footage of the horse animated to show it rearing up from the ground. A recording, produced by Mike Oldfield, was released by Oldfield Music in 1983.

The Uffington Horse is illustrated on the cover of English Settlement (1982), the fifth studio album by the Swindon band XTC, and appears (among other symbols copied from Barbara G. Walker's The Woman's Dictionary of Symbols and Sacred Objects) on the back cover of Nirvana's final album, In Utero (1993).

See also
 Cerne Abbas Giant
 Long Man of Wilmington
 List of Sites of Special Scientific Interest in Oxfordshire

Notes

Citations

Sources and further reading

External links

 
 
 
 
 
 
 

Archaeological sites in Berkshire
Archaeological sites in Oxfordshire
White horses (hill figures) in England
History of Berkshire
History of Oxfordshire
National Trust properties in Oxfordshire
Vale of White Horse
Tourist attractions in Oxfordshire
Bronze Age art
Berkshire folklore
Oxfordshire folklore
Scheduled monuments in Oxfordshire
Bronze Age sites in Oxfordshire